Henrietta Ónodi (born May 22, 1974) is a Hungarian artistic gymnast. She competed at the 1992 and 1996 Olympics and won a gold and a silver medal in 1992. After retiring from gymnastics in 1997 she moved to the United States, married American Olympic pentathlete Jimbo Haley, and became a naturalized U.S. citizen. In 2010, she was inducted into the International Gymnastics Hall of Fame.

Career
Ónodi, also known as "Heni" in the gymnastics community, began gymnastics in 1978 and made her international debut in 1986. Too young to qualify for the 1988 Olympics, she made her senior debut in 1989 and represented Hungary at the World Championships that year, where she placed 19th in the all-around and 5th in the balance beam event finals.

Over the next few years, Ónodi established herself as a medal contender at major events. In 1989 she became the first female Hungarian gymnast to medal at the European Championships with a gold on the uneven bars; at the 1990 Europeans she placed third in the all-around and the floor exercise. In 1990, she also finished third in the all-around at the Goodwill Games and the World Cup where she won the vault event. At the 1991 World Championships Ónodi suffered a sudden back injury but was able to win a silver medal on vault and helped the Hungarian squad qualify for the 1992 Olympics with an eighth-place finish in the team final.

The next year at the Olympics in Barcelona, Ónodi became the first female Hungarian gymnast in over 30 years to win an Olympic gold medal. She tied with Romanian Lavinia Miloșovici for the gold in the vault event final; on floor exercise, performing to "Hungarian Rhapsody" she finished second behind Miloşovici. Ónodi's difficulty level on vault was actually higher than Miloșovici's (they both used full twisting Yurchenkos but Henrietta did a piked barani and Milosovici a tucked). Ónodi also performed the difficult triple twist on floor, then an unusual move (nobody else in the Barcelona floor finals did it).

Ónodi semi-retired after Barcelona Olympics to focus on her studies. She returned to international competitions in 1995 at the World University Games and subsequently led the Hungarian team at the 1996 Olympics. She retired again in 1997 after attending her second University Games.

Skills and style

Ónodi made many contributions to gymnastics during her competitive career. She was lauded for her unique style and power on vaulting and floor. Her uneven bars routine consisted of elements on the low bar at a time when most gymnasts did the minimum two elements on the low bar.

Eponymous skill
Onodi has one eponymous skill listed in the Code of Points.

Post-retirement

In 2001 Ónodi graduated with a degree in marketing and found a job in Miami, Florida, as Director of Community Relations for the World Olympians Association. She married Jimbo Haley, an American pentathlete who also competed at the 1992 Olympics, and became a naturalized U.S. citizen. In 2010, she was inducted into the International Gymnastics Hall of Fame.

Competitive history

See also
 List of Olympic female gymnasts for Hungary

References

External links

 
 List of competitive results at Gymn-Forum
 Whatever happened to Henrietta Ónodi?
 Henrietta's Domain  unofficial fan site

1974 births
Living people
People from Békéscsaba
Hungarian female artistic gymnasts
Olympic gymnasts of Hungary
Olympic gold medalists for Hungary
Olympic silver medalists for Hungary
Olympic medalists in gymnastics
Gymnasts at the 1992 Summer Olympics
Gymnasts at the 1996 Summer Olympics
World champion gymnasts
Medalists at the World Artistic Gymnastics Championships
Medalists at the 1992 Summer Olympics
Originators of elements in artistic gymnastics
Naturalized citizens of the United States
Competitors at the 1990 Goodwill Games
Goodwill Games medalists in gymnastics
European champions in gymnastics
Sportspeople from Békés County